Compsulyx is a genus of moths in the  family Sphingidae. It contains only one species, Compsulyx cochereaui, which is known from New Caledonia.

References

Ambulycini
Monotypic moth genera
Moths of Oceania
Moths described in 1971